Frankford High School is a public high school in the School District of Philadelphia. It is located at Oxford Avenue and Wakeling Street in the Frankford section of Northeast Philadelphia, Pennsylvania. It has an award-winning and highly successful Culinary Arts Program.

Frankford was founded in 1910 as an annex to Central High School.  Around 1927, the Frankford Radio Club, a long-running amateur radio club, was founded at the school. This competitive radio club continues to this day; Alburtis, Pennsylvania is the current home of the club.

In the fall of 2018, Frankford High School launched the Frankford High School Aviation Academy, a unique program to provide a career path for the graduates of the program. Since the launch of the aviation program, Hospitality and Solar Panel CTE courses have been added as well.

The current Principal is Michael J. Calderone.

Aviation Academy
Beginning with the class of 2022, students have the opportunity to enroll in the Aviation Academy. After their completion, they can earn their private pilot license and by the time they are 21 be eligible for their commercial pilot license. The program will also include multiple tracks of study including drone-piloting and airplane mechanic/maintenance.

Sports
Having been founded as an annex to Central High School, Frankford inherited the gold and crimson from Central, but the addition of navy blue makes the school's colors distinctive. Frankford's slogan is "Home of Champions," a nod to its longstanding tradition of fielding strong sports teams. The school's athletic teams are nicknamed the Pioneers.

Frankford's soccer team won ten straight Public League Championships (1987–1996), four of which by shutout. Frankford's wrestling team won 11 straight Public League Championships ending in 2007.

Neighborhoods served
Neighborhoods served by the school include Bridesburg, Frankford, Northwood, Wissinoming, Oxford Circle, and Juniata.

Feeder patterns
Harding Middle School is Frankford's most significant feeder school, or one in which its graduating students matriculate to Frankford High.

Notable alumni
Zaire Anderson, NFL player
Joe Bonsall, singer The Oak Ridge Boys
Vince DeMentri, news anchor
John Diehl, former NFL player
Christine Duffy, business executive
Jahri Evans, Green Bay Packers, New Orleans Saints offensive guard
Earl G. Harrison, Dean of the University of Pennsylvania Law School; Commissioner of the United States Immigration and Naturalization Service, 1942–44
Bobby Higginson, former Detroit Tigers outfielder
Mike Jarmoluk, former Philadelphia Eagles defensive end
Ralph Lewis, former La Salle University and NBA guard
Jonathan Maberry, author and educator
Hector Andres Negroni, Air Force Fighter Pilot, Historian
Stevie Richards, professional wrestler
John Richter, NBA basketball player
Kaboni Savage, drug dealer and murderer
Blair Thomas, former Penn State and NFL running back
Isaiah Thomas, Philadelphia City Council member

See also

Northeast Philadelphia

References

External links
 Frankford High School
 
 Frankford Alumni site

School District of Philadelphia
Public high schools in Pennsylvania
Educational institutions established in 1910
1910 establishments in Pennsylvania
Frankford, Philadelphia